The 1995 Middle Tennessee Blue Raiders football team represented Middle Tennessee State University in the 1995 NCAA Division I-AA football season

Schedule

References

Middle Tennessee
Middle Tennessee Blue Raiders football seasons
Middle Tennessee Blue Raiders football